The 1929–30 Scottish Division One season was won by Rangers by five points over nearest rival Motherwell. Dundee United and St Johnstone finished 19th and 20th respectively and were relegated to the 1930–31 Scottish Division Two.

League table

Results

References

Scottish Football Archive

1929–30 Scottish Football League
Scottish Division One seasons
Scot